Buky Schwartz (pronounced BOO-kie) (June 16, 1932 – September 1, 2009, Tel Aviv) was an Israeli sculptor and video artist.

Biography
Moshe (Buky) Schwartz was born in Jerusalem. From 1956 to 1958, he studied sculpture with Yitzhak Danziger (1916–1977) at the Avni Institute of Art and Design in Tel Aviv. In 1959, he moved to London to study at Saint Martin's School of Art. In 1966–1967, he taught at Saint Martin's.

Art career

After returning to Israel in 1963, he became known for his painted steel sculptures that were predominately geometric in form. In 1971, he moved to New York City and began making "video structures" in which he filled a room with shapes that came together as a unified whole when projected on a video screen. He also placed mirrors inside sculptures that reflected the sculpture as a whole or certain parts of it. Schwartz also created conceptual art based on an exploration of his own body. He showed his video installations at The Cultural Space on Canal Street in Manhattan.

Schwartz lived and worked in Tel Aviv and New York City until his death in 2009.

Awards and recognition
 1961 Sainsbury Awards, Sainsbury's, United Kingdom
 1962 German Critics' Prize, Association of German Critics, Berlin, Germany
 1965 Dizengoff Prize for Sculpture
 1971 Nuremberg Urban Symposium Purchase Award, Nuremberg Urban Symposium, Nuremberg, Germany
 1980 Fellowship, Community Arts Partnership, New York, USA
 1983 Video Art Award, New York State Council on the Arts, New York, USA
 1983 Residency Program, Mid Atlantic Arts Foundation, USA
 1987 Guggenheim Award, Guggenheim, New York, USA
 1988 Sculpture Grant, National Endowment for the Arts, USA
 1989 Annual International Prize for Video Sculpture, L'immagine Elettronica, Italy
 1990 Grant for Publication, Guggenheim, New York, USA
 1991 Painting and sculpture prize, Ministry of Culture and Education
 1992 Video Sculpture Prize, Pollok Prize
 1995 Elhanani Prize, Tel Aviv, for Integration of Art and Architecture
 Yehoshua Rabinowitz Fund for Arts, for his painted steel sculpture at Rothschild Blvd, Tel Aviv

Outdoor sculptures
 1963–64 Altars and Water Channels, Weizmann Institute of Science, Rehovot, Israel
 1967 Pillar of heroism, Yad Vashem, Jerusalem
 1969 Gates, Yad Vashem, Jerusalem
 1969 White from 0 Degrees to 180 Degrees, Israel Museum, Jerusalem
 1986 Memorial to Jonathan Netanyahu, Philadelphia, Pennsylvania
 1986 Dead Sea Sculpture, Ein Bokek, Dead Sea
 1988–92 Painted steel sculpture, Rothschild Blvd, Tel Aviv
 1990 Metropolis, 1990, Tel Aviv University
 1996 Obelisk, Kibutz Galuiot St., Tel Aviv
 1997–98 Capital, outdoor sculpture, Isracard Building, Tel Aviv
 1997–98 Pinball machine, Isracard Building, Tel Aviv
 1998 Zig-Zag, landscape sculpture, steel, Park West, Ra'anana
 2001 "Leonardo" Ramat Poleg, Netanya, Israel
 2002 Between earth and sky, Kiriat Uno, Israel
 2002 The Giving Tree, Lavon Park, Holon, Israel
 2007 Mosquito, Tel Aviv Museum of Art
 2011 Aviron, Giv'atayim Theatre Sculpture Garden, Givatayim, Israel

Archive
Buky Schwartz's family donated his archival collection to the Israel Museum, Jerusalem in 2019. The Buky Schwartz Archive is housed at the museum's Information Center for Israeli Art. It contains some 2,000 archival items documenting the work process of the artist. Throughout his career Schwartz collected materials pertaining to his works including: handwritten installation manuals, correspondence, photographs, sketches, prints, negatives, invitations to exhibitions and other documentation. The content of the artist's analog video collection, approximately 50 tapes, consists of documentation of video installations, works in progress, and press releases including interviews with the artist. The video documentation of Schwartz’s installations illustrates the mechanics of the work, and the impact the work had on viewers. 

The Information Center is in the process of digitizing and cataloging the collection to make the images more accessible.

Gallery

See also
Visual arts in Israel

References

Further reading
 Bex, F., W. van Mulders, and H. van Pelt, Beyond Surface: Peter Berg, Benni Efrat, Tim Head, Buky Schwartz, Antwerp. Internationaal Cultureel Centrum, 1980.
 Hanhardt, John G., Buky Schwartz Videotapes 1978-80, Jerusalem, Israel Museum, 1980.
 Museum of Israeli Art, Buky Schwartz 1990, Ramat-Gan, Israel, Museum of Israeli Art, 1990.
 Tel-Aviv Museum, Helena Rubinstein Pavilion, Buky Schwartz Sculptures, Tel-Aviv, Tel-Aviv Museum, 1969.
 Videoart.net, 'Buky Schwartz Videoconstructions', with commentary by John G.Hanhardt, 2007.

External links
 Buky Schwartz artist's website
 
 
 

1932 births
2009 deaths
Israeli Jews
Jewish sculptors
Israeli sculptors
Modern sculptors
Israeli expatriates in the United States
People from Jerusalem
Academics of Saint Martin's School of Art
Alumni of Saint Martin's School of Art
20th-century sculptors